Paulo Nimer Pjota (born 1988) is a mixed media Brazilian artist. Pjota prefers to work on large surfaces. He uses canvas, sacks and scrap metal plates, mostly found in junkyards, as supports.

Biography
Paulo Nimer Pjota was born in São José do Rio Preto, Brazil in 1988. He studied at the University Center of Fine Arts of São Paulo earning his Bachelor of Visual Arts. Pjota now lives and works in São Paulo,. He is an artist of many mediums and prefers to work on large surfaces.

Education
2014 – Art History from Rodrigo Naves 
2012 – Critical art, Francisco Alambert and Polyana Canhete, SESC Pompeia
2010 – Bachelor of Visual Arts at the University Center Fine Arts of São Paulo

Work

Pjota's art consists of many colliding components that are neither literal or direct but rather suggestive and at times curious. "His works highlight the clichés of figurative and landscape painting".(Artuner) Each canvas is treated as a sketchbook of sorts in where you find a collection of images with no particular placement but each image intentionally.

Pjota suggests an open narrative in no particular order but the order in which the viewer's imagination takes. His work confronts the viewer with a string of juxtapositions. The archeological artifacts are compared with soda cans, still lifes overshadowed by war and popular culture meets what once was.

Exhibitions

Solo 
2016
Synthesis Of Contradictory Ideas and the Plurality of the Object as Image Part 2, Maureen Paley, London
Synthesis of Contradictory Ideas and the Plurality of the Object as Image, Mendes Wood DM, São Paulo
2013
Relational System project Season – Palace of Arts São Paulo, São Paulo
2012
Paulo Nimer Pjota, Mendes Wood DM, São Paulo, Brazil
1 shows the exhibition program Centro Cultural São Paulo 2012, São Paulo, 
2009
Walking in the White  solo exhibit Anno Domini Gallery, San Jose, California

Group (selected)

2017
A Luz Que Vela O Corpo É A Mesma Que Revela a Tela, Caixa. Cultural Rio de Janeiro, Rio de Janeiro, Brazil
2016
New Shamans / Novos Xamãs: Brazilian Artists, Rubell Family Collection, Miami, USA
Soft Power. Arte Brasil., Kunsthal in Amersfoort, The Netherlands
2015
The World is Made of Stories, Astrup Fearnley Museet, Oslo, Norway
City Uneasy, SESC Rio Preto, São José do Rio Preto, São Paulo, Brazil
Imagine Brazil, DHC / Foundation for Contemporary Art, Montreal, Canada
Ce Monde Fabuleux Moderne MAC-Lyon, Lyon, France
Imagine Brazil, Tomie Ohtake Institute, São Paulo, Brazil
19 Contemporary Art Festival SESC_Videobrasil – Southern Panoramas, SESC Pompeia, São Paulo, Brazil
Nourishing, OCA, São Paulo, Brazil
Nourishing Expo Milan, Milan, Italy
Boiling Point, gallery PSM, Berlin, Germany
Here There (Huna Hunak), QM Al Riwaq Gallery, Doha, Qatar
2014
Peace among animals, Rumors Fine Arts, São Paulo, Brazil
The part que does not belong to you, Kunsthaus, Wiesbaden, Germany
The First And Last Freedom, MOT international gallery, London, UK
Made by ... done by Brazilians, matarazzo city, São Paulo, Brazil
Imagine Brazil, Mac-Lyon, Lyon, France.
Nourishing, MAM-Rio, Rio de Janeiro, Brazil
10 years of the prize acquisition, Centro Cultural São Paulo, São Paulo
2013
Chambers à Part, Edition VIII, La Réseve Paris, Paris, France
Imagine Brazil, Astrup Feranley Museet, Oslo, Norway
Entre-temps ... Brusquement, et ensuite 12e Biennale de Lyon, Lyon, France
2012
Itinerancy SESC_Videobrasil, SESC, São José do Rio Preto, Campinas and Santos, Brazil
Landscape of Invention, Yes Gallery, Curitiba, Brazil
2011
Southern Panoramas, the 17th International Contemporary Art Festival
SESC_Videobrasil, SESC Belenzinho, São Paulo
Without Limits, Yes Gallery, Curitiba, Brazil
Untitled # 1-After-Death Experiences, Oscar Cruz Galeria, São Paulo
2010
Transfer of Cultures Museum Pavilion Brazilian, São Paulo, Brazil
2009
Paperview, John Jones Limited_Project Space, London, England
2008
Fresh Produce Anno Domini Gallery, San Jose, USA
Pliable, Contemporary Art Museum of Parana, Curitiba, Brazil
Illegitimate Paco das Artes, São Paulo, Brazil
2007
1 Hall Arts São José do Rio Preto, São José do Rio Preto, Brazil
39th Salon of Arts Piracicaba, Piracicaba, Brazil

References

1988 births
Living people
Brazilian male artists